The Netherlands national football team has appeared in ten UEFA European Championship tournaments. They first participated in 1976, and won the title in 1988. With Belgium, the Netherlands co-hosted the 2000 tournament. The team did not enter the first tournament in 1960, and did not qualify in 1964, 1968, 1972, 1984, 2016.

Overall record

List of matches

Euro 1976

Final tournament

Semi-finals

Third place play-off

Euro 1980

Group stage

Euro 1988

Group stage

Knockout stage

Semi-finals

Final

Euro 1992

Group stage

Knockout stage

Semi-finals

Euro 1996

Group stage

Knockout stage

Quarter-finals

Euro 2000

Group stage

Knockout stage

Quarter-finals

Semi-finals

Euro 2004

Group stage

Knockout stage

Quarter-finals

Semi-finals

Euro 2008

Group stage

Knockout phase

Quarter-finals

Euro 2012

Group stage

Euro 2020

Group stage

Knockout phase

Round of 16

Most appearances

Top goalscorers

References

External links
Netherlands at UEFA

 
Countries at the UEFA European Championship
Euro